The All India Muslim Personal Law Board (AIMPLB) is a non-government organisation constituted in 1973 by that time Prime Minister Mrs. Indira Gandhi to adopt suitable strategies for the protection and continued applicability of Muslim Personal Law in India, most importantly, the Muslim Personal Law (Shariat) Application Act of 1937, providing for the application of the Islamic Law Code of Shariat to Muslims in India in personal affairs. The Act applies to all matters of personal law except such successions. Even this section had the right under laws such as the Cutchi Memons Act, 1920 and the Mahomedan Inheritance Act (II of 1897) to opt for "Mahomedan Law".  Faizur Rahman claims that a majority of Muslim followed Muslim law, not the Hindu civil code.

The Board presents itself as the leading body of Muslim opinion in India, a role for which it has been criticised as well as supported. All India Muslim Personal Law Board was set up during Prime Minister Indira Gandhi's time.

Most of the Muslim sects are represented on the board and its members include prominent Muslims from cross section of the Indian Muslim society such as religious leaders, scholars, lawyers, politicians and other professionals. One of its presidents, Quazi Mujahidul Islam Quasmi played crucial role in keeping Muslim scholars from diverse field at the platform of AIMPLB. However, Muslim scholar Tahir Mahmood, Kerala Governor Arif Mohammad Khan and retired Supreme Court judge Markandey Katju have advocated abolishing of All India Muslim Personal Law Board.

The members of All India Muslim Personal Law Board do not apply to Ahmadiyya Muslims in India. Ahmadis were not allowed to sit on the All India Muslim Personal Law Board. This is widely regarded in India as representative of Muslims in the country as most Muslims don't consider the Ahmadis as Muslims.

Maulana Kalbe Sadiq, senior vice president of AIMPLB is also the vice chairman of the All India Shia Personal Law Board.

Description
AIMPLB is a private body working to protect Muslim personal laws, liaise with and influence the Government of India and guide the general public about crucial issues.  The board has a working committee of 51 ulama representing various schools of thought. In addition to this, it also has a general body of 201 persons of ulama as well as laymen, including about 25 women.

However, some of the Shias and Muslim feminists have formed their own separate boards, the All India Shia Personal Law Board and the All India Muslim Women's Personal Law Board, respectively but have failed to win any significant support from the Muslims or the government.

Executive committee

Rabey Hasani Nadvi is the incumbent president of the board and Kalbe Sadiq, Jalaluddin Umri, Fakhruddin Ashraf, Sayeed Ahmed Oomeri are its incumbent vice presidents. Khalid Saifullah Rahmani is the incumbent acting general secretary after the demise of Wali Rahmani and  Fazlur Rahim Mujaddedi, Zafaryab Jilani and Umrain Mahfooz Rahmani are its incumbent secretaries. Riaz Umar is the treasurer of the board.

Its executive members include K. Ali Kutty Musliyar,  Muhammad Sufyan Qasmi, Rahmatullah Mir Qasmi and others.

Associated scholars
 Sayyid Minatullah Rahmani (former General Secretary) 
 Mujahidul Islam Qasmi (former President)
 Muhammad Salim Qasmi (former Vice President)

Criticism 
The AIMPLB focuses primarily to defend the Sharia laws from any law or legislation that they consider infringes on it. In this role initially it has objected to any change in the Divorce Laws for Muslim women. In this regard it has even published a book – Nikah-O-Talaq (Marriage and Divorce). However, from time to time it has been hinted by the board that it might reconsider its position. It has also objected to gay rights and supports upholding the 1861 Indian law that bans sexual intercourse between persons of the same sex.

The Board has also objected to the Right of Children for Free and Compulsory Education Act, 2009 as they believe it will infringe on the Madrasa System of Education. It has also supported child marriage and opposes the Child Marriage Restraint Act. It supports marriage age as 15 but says we do not promote it but people should have choice. It has also objected to the High Court of India Judgement on Babri Mosque. For this, it is also willing to threaten political action. The Board was in the headlines for its opposition to the live video conference of author Salman Rushdie to the Jaipur Literature Festival in January 2012. After government considered making yoga compulsory in schools They argued that "there is a serious threat to our religion. There is a sinister design to impose 'Brahmin dharma' through yoga, Surya Namaskara and Vedic culture. They all are against Islamic beliefs. We need to awaken our community for launching a protest on a large scale"

Model Nikahnama
AIMPLB drafted a model 'nikahnama' in 2003 laying down specific guidelines and conditions on which a marriage can be annulled by both husband and wife in large sections of Sunni Muslims in Uttar Pradesh.

See also 
 All India Shia Personal Law Board
 List of Deobandi organisations

References

External links 
 All India Muslim Personal Law Board

 

Islamic organisations based in India
Legal organisations based in India
1973 establishments in India
Muslim politics in India
Deobandi fiqh
Deobandi organisations